The Sebilj is an Ottoman-style wooden fountain (sebil) in the centre of Baščaršija Square in Sarajevo built by Mehmed Pasha Kukavica in 1753. It was relocated by Austrian architect Alexander Wittek in 1891. According to a local legend, visitors who drink water from this fountain will return to Sarajevo someday.

Replicas 

A multi-national collaborative public arts project created a life-size contemporary interpretation of the famous public fountain and landmark in Birmingham, using traditional Bosnian design and craft techniques and combined with modern digital technology.

There is a replica of Sarajevo's Sebilj in Belgrade, Serbia, donated by the city of Sarajevo in 1989. Another replica in St. Louis, Missouri, in the United States, was donated by the Bosnian community to the city of St. Louis for the city's 250th birthday. A third replica is in Novi Pazar, also a gift from the city of Sarajevo. In Bursa, Turkey a replica of Sarajevo’s Sebilj was built as a symbol of friendship between the city of Bursa and the city of Sarajevo.

In 2018, another replica of the Sebilj has been completed in the city of Rožaje, Montenegro.

References

External links

History of Sarajevo
Monuments and memorials in Bosnia and Herzegovina
Stari Grad, Sarajevo
Fountains in Bosnia and Herzegovina
Infrastructure completed in 1753